Dəlləkli (known as Petropavlovka until 1992) is a village and municipality in the Quba Rayon of Azerbaijan. It has a population of 826.

References

Populated places in Quba District (Azerbaijan)